Melvin Bernard Blyth (born 28 July 1944) is an English former footballer who played for several clubs, including Southampton with whom he won the FA Cup in 1976, and Crystal Palace.

Norwich City and Scunthorpe United

Blyth started his football career with non-league Great Yarmouth. He then joined Norwich City, although he never made an appearance in the first team.

In October 1967, former Norwich manager, Ron Ashman, took up the reins at Scunthorpe United, then struggling at the foot of Division 3. He returned to his old club to sign several players, including Steve Deere, Geoff Barnard and Blyth to shore up the holes in the defence.

Scunthorpe were relegated at the end of the 1967–68 season and in July 1968, Blyth moved on to Crystal Palace.

Crystal Palace

Blyth joined Crystal Palace in the summer of 1968 as an old-style wing-half, but he developed into a centre-back. He immediately became a regular member of Palace's 1968–69 Division 2 promotion side, and in their first ever match in Division 1, he scored Palace's first goal in the top flight with a looping header against Manchester United. He scored another goal the following Saturday, against Everton.

As Palace struggled in Division 1, regularly finishing just above the relegation zone, Blyth became a permanent fixture in the defence alongside John McCormick. He was deposed as centre back for a while by Roger Hynd. But after playing in midfield for much of the 1969–70 season he won his place back when Hynd was temporarily switched to the forward line. The contrasting styles of Blyth and McCormick made for a good mix, and the two of them stayed together until McCormick moved to Wealdstone in 1973.

On 2 September 1972, Blyth made a tackle on Newcastle United's Tony Green which ultimately ended his career, although Green later said that he felt any contact was accidental.

Palace eventually lost their fight to avoid relegation at the end of the 1972–73 season, under manager Malcolm Allison. The following season, Blyth had a long spell of injury as Palace went straight down into Division 3. Shortly after the start of the 1974–75 season, in the same week that Ian Evans arrived from QPR, Blyth was signed by Southampton for a fee of £60,000.

Southampton
Southampton paid £60,000 for Mel Blyth in September 1974 – he was one of Lawrie McMenemy's first over-30 signings. Blyth's impact in his first season at The Dell was such that he was voted the supporters' player of the year.

His effective partnership with Jim Steele was the mainstay of Saints' victorious FA Cup run of 1976, including beating his former club, Crystal Palace, in the semi-final.

By the end of the 1976–77 season, six of the twelve players from Saints Cup-winning side had left the club; Blyth was the seventh after he had argued with McMenemy about breaking up the cup-winning team too quickly. The arrival of Chris Nicholl, in 1977, signalled the end of 33-year-old Blyth's sojourn on the South coast and, after a brief return to Palace, on loan, he completed his League career with Millwall.

In total he made 136 appearances for Southampton, scoring seven goals.

Back to Crystal Palace

Blyth re-appeared in Palace's colours in November 1977, when Terry Venables signed him on loan, after Ian Evans, who had replaced him in 1974, had broken his leg.

In both stints at Palace, Blyth made 262 first team appearances scoring 12 goals.

Millwall

In the summer of 1978 he moved to non-league Margate, and then in November 1978, he moved on to Millwall, where he made a further 86 appearances.

Later career

In the 1978 close-season he played for Cape Town City, then managed by former Palace coach, Frank Lord. At Cape Town, he played alongside Mick Channon and Kevin Keegan. He later played for Houston Hurricane, before a spell in 1981 in Hong Kong with Bulova alongside Charlie George and Barry Daines (goalkeeper, formerly at Spurs). After falling out with the manager, Ron Wylie, Mel returned to England, ending his career at non-league Andover.

After football

Although he was an electrician by trade, Blyth later became a driving instructor but, by November 1990 he was running his own building firm in south London. In 2003, he was a director of a building company and also a part-time coach in Crystal Palace's schoolboy academy.

Honours

As a player
Southampton
FA Cup winner 1976

References

External links
 

1944 births
Living people
Footballers from Norwich
Association football defenders
English footballers
Great Yarmouth Town F.C. players
Norwich City F.C. players
Scunthorpe United F.C. players
Crystal Palace F.C. players
Southampton F.C. players
Cape Town City F.C. (NFL) players
Margate F.C. players
Millwall F.C. players
North American Soccer League (1968–1984) players
Houston Hurricane players
Bulova SA players
Andover F.C. players
English Football League players
English expatriate sportspeople in the United States
Expatriate soccer players in the United States
English expatriate footballers
English expatriate sportspeople in South Africa
Expatriate soccer players in South Africa
 FA Cup Final players
National Football League (South Africa) players